Asafo Junior Aumua (born 5 May 1997) is a New Zealand professional rugby union player who plays as a hooker for New Zealand franchise Hurricanes and the New Zealand national team. In his youth, he was selected to play in the 2016 and 2017 World Rugby Under 20 Championships for New Zealand.

Aumua represents the Wellington provincial team and made his professional debut for the union in 2016 at the age of 19. He spent two seasons at the Bunnings NPC side, before earning a place in the Hurricanes 2018 Super Rugby squad. He won a championship with Wellington in 2017 and was named NZRU Age Grade Player of the Year. He has scored 38 career tries in all competitions. Aumua made his senior international debut for New Zealand in November 2017 at the age of 20, becoming one of the youngest players to represent New Zealand. He played in the 2017 northern end-of-year tour.

Early life 
Asafo Junior Aumua was born on 5 May 1997 in Wellington, the son of Tautua and Lisa Aumua. The Aumua family are of Samoan descent. Growing up in Naenae, he attended Naenae Intermediate School and St. Patrick's College Silverstream. While at secondary school, Aumua was chosen to play for Silverstream first XV at the age of fifteen. He spent three years representing the side, winning two regional sevens titles and was a part of two unbeaten runs through the round robin of the WelTec premiership. In rugby sevens, Aumua was named player of the tournament at the Marist College event, and joined the New Zealand Marist sevens squad for their tour of Samoa. He primarily played hooker, but also played second five-eighth, prop, and number 8 at first XV level.

After his last year at Silverstream, Aumua was enrolled into the 26-man New Zealand Secondary Schools team for a three-match international series in Australia. He was involved in a 24-point victory over Australian Schoolboys, where he scored a try that was recognized by Green and Gold Rugby journalist Nic Darveniza as try of the match, extending New Zealand's lead in the second half. Aumua was one of six Wellington players to represent New Zealand at the World Rugby Under 20 Championships in Manchester in June 2016. The following year, he was named to travel to Tbilisi, in his second Under 20 World Championship campaign. New Zealand won their sixth title after defeating England 64–17 in a record score in a final, scoring ten tries to three. Aumua scored a hat-trick, including one solo try in which he beat no less than six defenders. He became only the second player to score a hat-trick in a final.

Professional career

2016–18 
During the 2016 season, at 19 years old, he made his first professional team debut when he came on as a reserve forward during the opening match against Hawke's Bay at McLean Park. Representing the Wellington under-19 team in Taupō, Aumua was ordered back after Leni Apisai failed concussion protocols in preparation against Northland. He scored three tries in the fixture, making him just the fourth hooker to register a hat-trick in the competition's history. Aumua was the side's leading try-scorer with six in 10 games.

His performance at national age grade level in 2017 impressed Wellington head coach Chris Gibbes ahead of the 2017 Mitre 10 Cup, and he was subsequently renamed in the squad for their upcoming season. Aumua started well for Wellington, scoring three tries through the first three games of the competition. His scoring ability was noted after beating outside back defender George Bridge for a  solo try. It saw Aumua place fourth-equal in the overall leading try-scorers with fellow front rower and teammate, Alex Fidow on seven tries each.

Following his 2017 provincial campaign, Aumua was called up into the All Blacks for the 2017 end of year tour despite the fact that he had not even made his Super Rugby debut. He debuted for New Zealand alongside Matt Duffie and Tim Perry against the Barbarian F.C. in November 2017, replacing Nathan Harris off the bench in the 67th minute. Aumua was denied a potential try due to a forward pass from Hurricanes team-mate Jeffery Toomaga-Allen, but the All Blacks still managed to beat the Barbarians 31–22. He also replaced Harris off the bench 10 days later in a midweek game against a French XV selection, helping New Zealand win 28–23. Because neither of those fixtures was tests, Aumua would still await his test debut.

Aumua made his debut for the Hurricanes, against the Canterbury-based side the Crusaders, on 10 March 2018 during round 4 of the 2018 Super Rugby season. Aumua replaced Ricky Riccitelli in the second half of the match, with the Hurricanes winning against the Crusaders 29–19. Aumua performed well in all four of his 2018 Super Rugby appearances but was ruled out for the rest of the 2018 Super Rugby season due to a fractured wrist sustained against the Sharks during a narrow 38–37 victory in April 2018. Aumua's rehabilitation period was scheduled for 12 weeks.

Following a wrist injury, Aumua appeared in Wellington's 31-man squad announcement after head coach Chris Gibbes released their premiership side in August 2018. He made his return to play for Wellington in week one of the 2018 Mitre 10 Cup competition against Otago. At seasons-end Aumua appeared in their away semi-final, against Auckland and was re-called to the New Zealand squad to prepare for Japan in November for the 2018 end of year tour. Aumua's re-call to the All Blacks unfortunately saw him fail to make the field, with Hurricanes Captain, Dane Coles, returning from injury.

2019–21 
Aumua rejoined the Hurricanes squad for their upcoming season after head coach John Plumtree named his inclusion during the 2019 Super Rugby side announcement in October 2018. He made his first appearance of 2019 against the Chiefs at FMG Stadium Waikato on 15 March. Aumua picked up a concussion in the last minute of the Chiefs match and was rested for a week. Dane Coles' ongoing run of injuries saw Aumua start in most games of the Super Rugby season, with Coles eventually returning to captain the team in the playoffs.

Aumua played well throughout early 2019, displacing Nathan Harris from the New Zealand squad for the 2019 Rugby Championship. Aumua, however, failed to make his test debut during the competition, with the form of Liam Coltman proving too strong. This saw Aumua as one of five players to be dropped, on 1 August, following a test against South Africa. After being released from international duties, Aumua missed the first-round match against Tasman but returned as one of four changes that were named to play against Hawke's Bay in Napier for the 2019 Mitre 10 Cup. He scored a brace against Waikato to help secure Wellington a home semi-final with a bonus-point win.

Aumua impressed in the inaugural game of the 2020 Super Rugby Aotearoa season after showcasing big tackles and charge downs. In round two, he scored the Hurricanes only try of the game against the Crusaders after an offload from Ngani Laumape to put Aumua in with just ten minutes to go to draw the game at 25 points each. With Dane Coles suffering a minor injury, made way for Aumua to make his first start in the competition against the Highlanders. In August, New Zealand Rugby and the Hurricanes secured a contract extension for Aumua through until 2023.

After the COVID-19 pandemic in New Zealand, it was confirmed an historic one-off North versus South match was to be played in Wellington with no fans. Aumua was selected to take part in the fixture, starting at hooker. The match was classed as a trail for players to be selected in the New Zealand international side. He was recalled into the side by new head coach Ian Foster in a 35-man squad. Before being assembled for international duties, Aumua among other national players played in the Mitre 10 Cup prior to travelling. He played in two matches for Wellington in the first two weeks of the competition. After missing the first test in Auckland, Aumua traveled to Australia for the 2020 Tri Nations Series. He made his first test appearance against Australia along with Akira Ioane, Cullen Grace, and Will Jordan.

Statistics 

Updated: 5 June 2022
Source: Asafo J Aumua Rugby History

List of international test tries 

Updated: 5 June 2022
Source: Asafo J Aumua Statsguru

References

External links

 Asafo Aumua at All Blacks.com

1997 births
New Zealand sportspeople of Samoan descent
New Zealand rugby union players
Rugby union hookers
Rugby union players from Lower Hutt
Living people
New Zealand international rugby union players
Wellington rugby union players
Hurricanes (rugby union) players